The 2013–14 New York Rangers season was the franchise's 87th season of play and their 88th season overall. It was the Rangers' first season in the newly-created Metropolitan Division, which was created during the NHL's realignment in the 2013 offseason. The Rangers won 25 road games in the regular season, setting a franchise record. The Rangers returned to the Stanley Cup Finals for the first time since their championship in the 1993–94 season, losing in five games to the Los Angeles Kings.

Off-season
The Rangers first order of business for the 2013–14 season was to find a new head coach after letting John Tortorella go on May 29, 2013. The Rangers hired recently fired Canucks coach Alain Vigneault on June 21. Coincidentally, Tortorella would be hired as the new Canucks coach only days after Vigneault was hired by the Rangers. The Rangers finished their coaching staff on August 6 by hiring Scott Arniel as an associate coach, along with former players Ulf Samuelsson and Daniel Lacroix as assistant coaches.

Pre-season
The New York Rangers lost five of their six pre-season games, during which they scored nine goals and allowed 22 goals against. They went 2-for-22 on the power play and allowed five power play goals against in the last three games.

Regular season 
Due to final stages of renovations at Madison Square Garden, the Rangers opened the season on a nine-game road trip from October 3 to 24, during which the team went 3–6–0. The Rangers had a franchise-record nine-game homestand from December 7 to 23, during which they had a record of 3–4–2.

As part of the 2014 NHL Stadium Series games, the Rangers played two consecutive outdoor games at Yankee Stadium on January 26 against the New Jersey Devils (7–3 win) and on January 29 against the New York Islanders (2–1 win).

The NHL took a two-week break from February 9 to February 25 for the Olympics. The Rangers had seven players represent their countries: Ryan Callahan, Ryan McDonagh and Derek Stepan for the United States; Rick Nash for Canada; Mats Zuccarello for Norway; and Carl Hagelin and Henrik Lundqvist for Sweden.

On April 7, with a New Jersey Devils loss to the Calgary Flames, the Rangers clinched a playoff spot for the fourth consecutive season, and for the eighth time out of nine seasons.

On April 10, with a 2–1 win over the Buffalo Sabres and a Philadelphia Flyers 4–2 loss to the Tampa Bay Lightning, the Rangers clinched second place in their division and home ice advantage for the first round of the Stanley Cup playoffs.

Standings

Schedule and results

Pre-season

|- style="text-align:center; background:#fcc;"
| 1 || 16 || @ New Jersey Devils || 1–2 || 0–1–0
|-  style="text-align:center; background:#cfc;"
| 2 || 17 || @ Philadelphia Flyers || 3–2 || 1–1–0
|- style="text-align:center; background:#fcc;"
| 3 || 23 || @ Calgary Flames || 1–4 || 1–2–0
|- style="text-align:center; background:#fcc;"
| 4 || 24 || @ Edmonton Oilers || 3–5 || 1–3–0
|- style="text-align:center; background:#fcc;"
| 5 || 26 || @ Vancouver Canucks || 0–5 || 1–4–0
|- style="text-align:center; background:#fcc;"
| 6 || 27 || @ Los Angeles Kings || 1–4 || 1–5–0
|-
| colspan=5 | Game was played at the MGM Grand Garden Arena in Paradise, Nevada, as part of the Frozen Fury series of exhibition games.
|-

Regular season

|- style="text-align:center; background:#fcc;"
| 1 || 3 || @ Phoenix Coyotes || 1–4 || Lundqvist || 0–1–0
|-  style="text-align:center; background:#cfc;"
| 2 || 7 || @ Los Angeles Kings || 3–1 || Lundqvist || 1–1–0
|- style="text-align:center; background:#fcc;"
| 3 || 8 || @ San Jose Sharks || 2–9 || Lundqvist || 1–2–0
|- style="text-align:center; background:#fcc;"
| 4 || 10 || @ Anaheim Ducks || 0–6 || Lundqvist || 1–3–0
|- style="text-align:center; background:#fcc;"
| 5 || 12 || @ St. Louis Blues || 3–5 || Biron || 1–4–0
|-  style="text-align:center; background:#cfc;"
| 6 || 16 || @ Washington Capitals || 2–0 || Lundqvist || 2–4–0
|- style="text-align:center; background:#fcc;"
| 7 || 19 || @ New Jersey Devils || 0–4 || Lundqvist || 2–5–0
|- style="text-align:center; background:#fcc;"
| 8 || 24 || @ Philadelphia Flyers || 1–2 || Talbot || 2–6–0
|-  style="text-align:center; background:#cfc;"
| 9 || 26 || @ Detroit Red Wings || 3–2 (OT) || Talbot || 3–6–0
|- style="text-align:center; background:#fcc;"
| 10 || 28 || Montreal Canadiens || 0–2 || Lundqvist || 3–7–0
|-  style="text-align:center; background:#cfc;"
| 11 || 29 || @ New York Islanders || 3–2 || Talbot || 4–7–0
|-  style="text-align:center; background:#cfc;"
| 12 || 31 || Buffalo Sabres || 2–0 || Lundqvist || 5–7–0
|-

|-  style="text-align:center; background:#cfc;"
| 13 || 2 || Carolina Hurricanes || 5–1 || Lundqvist || 6–7–0
|- style="text-align:center; background:#fcc;"
| 14 || 4 || Anaheim Ducks || 1–2 || Lundqvist || 6–8–0
|-  style="text-align:center; background:#cfc;"
| 15 || 6 || Pittsburgh Penguins || 5–1 || Lundqvist || 7–8–0
|-  style="text-align:center; background:#cfc;"
| 16 || 7 || @ Columbus Blue Jackets || 4–2 || Talbot || 8–8–0
|-  style="text-align:center; background:#cfc;"
| 17 || 10 || Florida Panthers || 4–3 || Lundqvist || 9–8–0
|- style="text-align:center; background:#fcc;"
| 18 || 12 || New Jersey Devils || 3–2 || Lundqvist || 9–9–0
|-  style="text-align:center; background:#cfc;"
| 19 || 16 || @ Montreal Canadiens || 1–0 || Talbot || 10–9–0
|- style="text-align:center; background:#fcc;"
| 20 || 17 || Los Angeles Kings || 0–1 || Lundqvist || 10–10–0
|- style="text-align:center; background:#fcc;"
| 21 || 19 || Boston Bruins || 1–2 || Lundqvist || 10–11–0
|-  style="text-align:center; background:#cfc;"
| 22 || 21 || @ Dallas Stars || 3–2 || Lundqvist || 11–11–0
|-  style="text-align:center; background:#cfc;"
| 23 || 23 || @ Nashville Predators || 2–0 || Talbot || 12–11–0
|- style="text-align:center; background:#fcc;"
| 24 || 25 || @ Tampa Bay Lightning || 0–5 || Lundqvist || 12–12–0
|-  style="text-align:center; background:#cfc;"
| 25 || 27 || @ Florida Panthers || 5–2 || Lundqvist || 13–12–0
|- style="text-align:center; background:#fcc;"
| 26 || 29 || @ Boston Bruins || 2–3 || Lundqvist || 13–13–0
|-  style="text-align:center; background:#cfc;"
| 27 || 30 || Vancouver Canucks || 5–2 || Talbot || 14–13–0
|-

|- style="text-align:center; background:#fcc;"
| 28 || 2 || Winnipeg Jets || 2–5 || Talbot || 14–14–0
|- style="text-align:center; background:#cfc;"
| 29 || 5 || @ Buffalo Sabres || 3–1 || Lundqvist || 15–14–0
|- style="text-align:center; background:white;"
| 30 || 7 || New Jersey Devils || 3–4 (OT) || Lundqvist || 15–14–1
|- style="text-align:center; background:#fcc;"
| 31 || 8 || Washington Capitals || 1–4 || Lundqvist || 15–15–1
|- style="text-align:center; background:#fcc;"
| 32 || 10 || Nashville Predators || 1–4 || Lundqvist || 15–16–1
|- style="text-align:center; background:#fcc;"
| 33 || 12 || Columbus Blue Jackets || 2–4 || Lundqvist || 15–17–1
|-  style="text-align:center; background:#cfc;"
| 34 || 15 || Calgary Flames || 4–3 (SO) || Lundqvist || 16–17–1
|- style="text-align:center; background:white;"
| 35 || 18 || Pittsburgh Penguins || 3–4 (SO) || Lundqvist || 16–17–2
|- style="text-align:center; background:#fcc;"
| 36 || 20 || New York Islanders || 3–5 || Lundqvist || 16–18–2
|- style="text-align:center; background:#cfc;"
| 37 || 22 || Minnesota Wild || 4–1 || Talbot || 17–18–2
|- style="text-align:center; background:#cfc;"
| 38 || 23 || Toronto Maple Leafs || 2–1 (SO) || Talbot || 18–18–2
|- style="text-align:center; background:#fcc;"
| 39 || 27 || @ Washington Capitals || 2–3 || Talbot || 18–19–2
|- style="text-align:center; background:#cfc;"
| 40 || 29 || @ Tampa Bay Lightning || 4–3 || Lundqvist || 19–19–2
|- style="text-align:center; background:#cfc;"
| 41 || 31 || @ Florida Panthers || 2–1 (SO) || Lundqvist || 20–19–2
|-

|- style="text-align:center; background:#fcc;"
| 42 || 3 || @ Pittsburgh Penguins || 2–5 || Lundqvist || 20–20–2
|- style="text-align:center; background:#cfc;"
| 43 || 4 || @ Toronto Maple Leafs || 7–1 || Talbot || 21–20–2
|- style="text-align:center;" bgcolor="white"
| 44 || 6 || Columbus Blue Jackets || 3–4 (SO) || Lundqvist || 21–20–3
|- style="text-align:center; background:#cfc;"
| 45 || 8 || @ Chicago Blackhawks || 3–2 || Lundqvist || 22–20–3
|- style="text-align:center; background:#cfc;"
| 46 || 10 || Dallas Stars || 3–2 || Lundqvist || 23–20–3
|- style="text-align:center; background:#cfc;"
| 47 || 12 || Philadelphia Flyers || 4–1 || Lundqvist || 24–20–3
|- style="text-align:center; background:#fcc;"
| 48 || 14 || Tampa Bay Lightning || 1–2 || Lundqvist || 24–21–3
|- style="text-align:center; background:#cfc;"
| 49 || 16 || Detroit Red Wings || 1–0 || Lundqvist || 25–21–3
|- style="text-align:center; background:#cfc;"
| 50 || 18 || @ Ottawa Senators || 4–1 || Talbot || 26–21–3
|- style="text-align:center; background:#cfc;"
| 51 || 19 || Washington Capitals || 4–1 || Lundqvist || 27–21–3
|- style="text-align:center; background:#fcc;"
| 52 || 21 || New York Islanders || 3–5 || Talbot || 27–22–3
|- style="text-align:center; background:#fcc;"
| 53 || 23 || St. Louis Blues || 1–2 || Lundqvist || 27–23–3
|- style="text-align:center; background:#cfc;"
| 54 || 26 || @ New Jersey Devils || 7–3 || Lundqvist || 28–23–3
|- style="text-align:center; background:#cfc;"
| 55 || 29 || @ New York Islanders || 2–1 || Lundqvist || 29–23–3
|- style="text-align:center; background:#cfc;"
| 56 || 31 || New York Islanders || 4–1 || Lundqvist || 30–23–3
|-
| colspan=6 | Games were played at Yankee Stadium in The Bronx, New York.
|-

|- style="text-align:center; background:#cfc;"
| 57 || 4 || Colorado Avalanche || 5–1 || Lundqvist || 31–23–3
|- style="text-align:center; background:#fcc;"
| 58 || 6 || Edmonton Oilers || 1–2 || Talbot || 31–24–3
|- style="text-align:center; background:#cfc;"
| 59 || 7 || @ Pittsburgh Penguins || 4–3 (SO) || Lundqvist || 32–24–3
|- style="text-align:center; background:#cfc;"
| 60 || 27 || Chicago Blackhawks || 2–1 || Talbot || 33–24–3
|-

|- style="text-align:center; background:#fcc;"
| 61 || 1 || @ Philadelphia Flyers || 2–4 || Lundqvist || 33–25–3
|- style="text-align:center; background:#fcc;"
| 62 || 2 || Boston Bruins || 3–6 || Lundqvist || 33–26–3
|- style="text-align:center;" bgcolor="white"
| 63 || 5 || Toronto Maple Leafs || 2–3 (OT) || Lundqvist || 33–26–4
|- style="text-align:center; background:#cfc;"
| 64 || 7 || @ Carolina Hurricanes || 4–2 || Lundqvist || 34–26–4
|- style="text-align:center; background:#cfc;"
| 65 || 9 || Detroit Red Wings || 3–0 || Lundqvist || 35–26–4
|- style="text-align:center; background:#fcc;"
| 66 || 11 || @ Carolina Hurricanes || 1–3 || Lundqvist || 35–27–4
|- style="text-align:center; background:#fcc;"
| 67 || 13 || @ Minnesota Wild || 1–2 || Talbot || 35–28–4
|- style="text-align:center; background:#cfc;"
| 68 || 14 || @ Winnipeg Jets || 4–2 || Lundqvist || 36–28–4
|- style="text-align:center; background:#fcc;"
| 69 || 16 || San Jose Sharks || 0–1 || Lundqvist || 36–29–4
|- style="text-align:center; background:#cfc;"
| 70 || 18 || @ Ottawa Senators || 8–4 || Lundqvist || 37–29–4
|- style="text-align:center; background:#cfc;"
| 71 || 21 || @ Columbus Blue Jackets || 3–1 || Lundqvist || 38–29–4
|- style="text-align:center; background:#cfc;"
| 72 || 22 || @ New Jersey Devils || 2–0 || Lundqvist || 39–29–4
|- style="text-align:center; background:#cfc;"
| 73 || 24 || Phoenix Coyotes || 4–3 OT || Lundqvist || 40–29–4
|- style="text-align:center; background:#cfc;"
| 74 || 26 || Philadelphia Flyers || 3–1 || Lundqvist || 41–29–4
|- style="text-align:center; background:#fcc;"
| 75 || 28 || @ Calgary Flames || 3–4 || Lundqvist || 41–30–4
|- style="text-align:center; background:#cfc;"
| 76 || 30 || @ Edmonton Oilers || 5–0 || Talbot || 42–30–4
|-

|- style="text-align:center; background:#cfc;"
| 77 || 1 || @ Vancouver Canucks || 3–1 || Lundqvist || 43–30–4
|- style="text-align:center;" bgcolor="white"
| 78 || 3 || @ Colorado Avalanche || 2–3 (SO) || Lundqvist || 43–30–5
|- style="text-align:center; background:#fcc;"
| 79 || 5 || Ottawa Senators || 2–3 || Lundqvist || 43–31–5
|- style="text-align:center; background:#cfc;"
| 80 || 8 || Carolina Hurricanes || 4–1 || Lundqvist || 44–31–5
|- style="text-align:center; background:#cfc;"
| 81 || 10 || Buffalo Sabres || 2–1 || Lundqvist || 45–31–5
|- style="text-align:center;" bgcolor="white"
| 82 || 12 || @ Montreal Canadiens || 0–1 (OT) || Talbot || 45–31–6
|-

Playoffs

The New York Rangers ended the 2013–14 regular season as the Metropolitan Division's second seed. They defeated the third seed Philadelphia Flyers in the first round, 4–3. Then they faced the first seed Pittsburgh Penguins in the second round of the playoffs. For the first time in Rangers history, the team came back from a 3–1 series deficit to win the series in seven games. Next, they defeated the Atlantic Division’s third seed Montreal Canadiens in the Eastern Conference Final in the third round, 4–2, and became the Eastern Conference Champions. They are the first team in NHL history that played the maximum of 14 games over the first two rounds and still had enough to advance to the final. After 20 years, the Rangers headed to the Stanley Cup Finals, where they faced the Western Conference champion Los Angeles Kings. The Rangers lost three games in overtime and lost the series 4–1.

|-  style="text-align:center; background:#cfc;"
| 1 || April 17 || Philadelphia Flyers || 4–1 || Lundqvist || Rangers lead 1–0
|- style="text-align:center; background:#fcc;"
| 2 || April 20 || Philadelphia Flyers || 2–4 || Lundqvist || Series tied 1–1
|-  style="text-align:center; background:#cfc;"
| 3 || April 22 || @ Philadelphia Flyers || 4–1 || Lundqvist || Rangers lead 2–1
|-  style="text-align:center; background:#fcc;"
| 4 || April 25 || @ Philadelphia Flyers || 1–2 || Lundqvist || Series tied 2–2
|- style="text-align:center; background:#cfc;"
| 5 || April 27 || Philadelphia Flyers || 4–2 || Lundqvist || Rangers lead 3–2
|-  style="text-align:center; background:#fcc;"
| 6 || April 29 || @ Philadelphia Flyers || 2–5 || Lundqvist || Series tied 3–3
|-  style="text-align:center; background:#cfc;"
| 7 || April 30 || Philadelphia Flyers || 2–1 || Lundqvist || Rangers win 4–3
|-

|-style="text-align:center; background:#cfc;" 
| 1 || May 2 || @ Pittsburgh Penguins || 3–2 OT || Lundqvist || Rangers lead 1–0 
|- style="text-align:center; background:#fcc;"
| 2 || May 4 || @ Pittsburgh Penguins || 0–3 || Lundqvist || Series tied 1–1
|- style="text-align:center; background:#fcc;"
| 3 || May 5 || Pittsburgh Penguins || 0–2 || Lundqvist || Penguins lead 2–1
|- style="text-align:center; background:#fcc;"
| 4 || May 7 || Pittsburgh Penguins || 2–4 || Lundqvist || Penguins lead 3–1
|- style="text-align:center; background:#cfc;"
| 5 || May 9 || @ Pittsburgh Penguins || 5–1 || Lundqvist || Penguins lead 3–2
|-style="text-align:center; background:#cfc;"
| 6 || May 11 || Pittsburgh Penguins || 3–1 || Lundqvist || Series tied 3–3
|-style="text-align:center; background:#cfc;"
| 7 || May 13 || @ Pittsburgh Penguins || 2–1 || Lundqvist || Rangers win 4–3
|-

|-style="text-align:center; background:#cfc;"
| 1 || May 17 || @ Montreal Canadiens || 7–2 || Lundqvist || Rangers lead 1–0   
|-style="text-align:center; background:#cfc;"
| 2 || May 19 || @ Montreal Canadiens || 3–1 || Lundqvist || Rangers lead 2–0
|-style="text-align:center; background:#fcc;"
| 3 || May 22 || Montreal Canadiens || 2–3 OT || Lundqvist || Rangers lead 2–1
|-style="text-align:center; background:#cfc;"
| 4 || May 25 || Montreal Canadiens || 3–2 OT || Lundqvist || Rangers lead 3–1
|-style="text-align:center; background:#fcc;"
| 5 || May 27 || @ Montreal Canadiens || 4–7 || Talbot || Rangers lead 3–2
|-style="text-align:center; background:#cfc;"
| 6 || May 29 || Montreal Canadiens || 1–0 || Lundqvist || Rangers win 4–2
|-

|-style="text-align:center; background:#fcc;"
| 1 || June 4 || @ Los Angeles Kings || 2–3 OT || Lundqvist || Kings lead 1–0    
|-style="text-align:center; background:#fcc;"
| 2 || June 7 || @ Los Angeles Kings || 4–5 2OT || Lundqvist || Kings lead 2–0
|-style="text-align:center; background:#fcc;"
| 3 || June 9 || Los Angeles Kings || 0–3 || Lundqvist || Kings lead 3–0
|-style="text-align:center; background:#cfc;"
| 4 || June 11 || Los Angeles Kings || 2–1 || Lundqvist || Kings lead 3–1
|-style="text-align:center; background:#fcc;"
| 5 || June 13 || @ Los Angeles Kings || 2–3 2OT  || Lundqvist || Kings win 4–1
|-

|-
|

Player statistics
Final stats
Skaters

Goaltenders

†Denotes player spent time with another team before joining the Rangers. Stats reflect time with the Rangers only.
‡Denotes player was traded mid-season. Stats reflect time with the Rangers only.
Bold/italics denotes franchise record.

Awards and records

Awards

Milestones

Records

Transactions
The Rangers have been involved in the following transactions during the 2013–14 season:

Trades

Free agents acquired

Free agents lost

Claimed via waivers

Lost via waivers

Lost via retirement

Player signings

Draft picks

New York Rangers' picks at the 2013 NHL Entry Draft, which was held in Newark, New Jersey, on June 30, 2013.

Draft notes
 The New York Rangers' first-round pick went to the Columbus Blue Jackets as the result of a July 23, 2012, trade that sent Rick Nash, Steven Delisle and a 2013 conditional third-round pick to the Rangers in exchange for Artem Anisimov, Brandon Dubinsky, Tim Erixon and this pick.
 The New York Rangers' second-round pick went to the San Jose Sharks as the result of an April 2, 2013, trade that sent Ryane Clowe to the Rangers in exchange for a 2013 third-round pick (previously acquired from Florida), a 2014 conditional round pick and this pick.
 The Nashville Predators' third-round pick went to the New York Rangers as a result of a June 23, 2012, trade that sent a 2012 third-round pick (#89–Brendan Leipsic) to the Predators in exchange for this pick.
 The Columbus Blue Jackets' third-round pick went to the New York Rangers as a result of a July 23, 2012, trade that sent Artem Anisimov, Brandon Dubinsky, Tim Erixon and a 2013 first-round pick to the Blue Jackets in exchange for Rick Nash, Steven Delisle and this pick.
 The New York Rangers' fifth-round pick went to the Nashville Predators as the result of a June 23, 2012, trade that sent a 2012 fifth-round pick (#142–Thomas Spelling) to the Rangers in exchange for this pick.
 The New York Rangers' seventh-round pick went to the Minnesota Wild as the result of a February 3, 2012, trade that sent Casey Wellman to the Rangers in exchange for Erik Christensen and this pick.

References

New York Rangers seasons
New York Rangers
New York Rangers
New York Rangers
New York Rangers
 in Manhattan
Eastern Conference (NHL) championship seasons
Madison Square Garden
N